Edgar Bastidas (born 23 August 1969 in Caracas, Distrito Capital) is a Venezuelan tenor.
 
He studied in the musical institute Mikhail Glinka in Dnipropetrovsk (now Dnipro) in Ukraine, with the teacher María E. Markina. He studied from 1991 to 1995 in the Kiev State Conservatory "Piotr I. Tchaikovsky" in Ukraine, with the Russian Professor Vladimir I. Timohin.
He began his career in the Opera Studio of the same Conservatory, as a soloist, interpreting Lensky in the opera Eugene Onegin, Alfredo in La Traviata, Almaviva in The Barber of Seville, and the Duke of Mantua in Rigoletto.

He has worked with many distinguished conductors including  Lev Gorvatenko, Ruslan Doroyivsky, Roman Koffman, Boris Velat, Jan Drietomsky, and Pablo Castellanos.
He has carried out presentations in European theaters interpreting leading roles such as Almaviva, Nemorino, Duca di Mantova, Gringoire and Alfredo.
Bastidas's repertoire encompasses lieder, Spanish Songs, Russian songs, Latin American songs, contemporary, Italian and Neapolitan songs.

Repertoire 
Rossini: Il Barbiere di Siviglia - (Conte Almaviva)
Donizetti: L'Elisir d'amore - (Nemorino)
Donizetti: Lucia di Lammermoor - (Edgardo)
Verdi: La Traviata - (Alfredo)
Verdi: Rigoletto - (Duque de Mantua)
Verdi: Macbeth - (Macduff)
Massenet: Werther - (Werther)
Tchaikovsky: Eugene Oneguin - (Lensky)
Rachmaninov: Aleko - (Young Gypsy)
Mascagni: Cavallería Rusticana - (Turiddu )
Puccini: La Bohème
Gounod: Fausto - (Fausto)

References

External links
 Official site

1969 births
Living people
Venezuelan operatic tenors
Singers from Caracas
20th-century male opera singers
20th-century Venezuelan male singers
21st-century male opera singers
21st-century Venezuelan male singers